Licking Creek is a stream in the U.S. state of West Virginia.

Licking Creek most likely was so named on account of mineral licks near its course.

See also
List of rivers of West Virginia

References

Rivers of Tucker County, West Virginia
Rivers of West Virginia